The Church of the Contraternity of Holy Cross is a former Roman Catholic oratory or small church located in Via Monte Calvario #16 of the town of Villanova Mondovì, province of Cuneo, region of Piedmont, Italy. The late Baroque-style building (1755) with a curvilinear lateral flanks of the brick facade and elaborate dome was designed by Bernardo Vittone and Francesco Gallo. It lies across the street from the more ancient church of Santa Caterina

References

Roman Catholic churches completed in 1755
18th-century Roman Catholic church buildings in Italy
Churches in the province of Cuneo
Bernardo Antonio Vittone buildings
Baroque architecture in Piedmont
Church buildings with domes